Tonetto is an Italian surname. Notable people with the surname include:

Diego Tonetto (born 1988), Argentine footballer
Max Tonetto (born 1974), Italian footballer

Italian-language surnames
Patronymic surnames
Surnames of Italian origin